In mathematics, an autonomous category is a monoidal category where dual objects exist.

Definition 
A left (resp. right) autonomous category is a monoidal category where every object has a left (resp. right) dual. An autonomous category is a monoidal category where every object has both a left and a right dual. Rigid category is a synonym for autonomous category. 

In a symmetric monoidal category, the existence of left duals is equivalent to the existence of right duals, categories of this kind are called (symmetric) compact closed categories. 

In categorial grammars, categories which are both left and right rigid are often called pregroups, and are employed in Lambek calculus, a non-symmetric extension of linear logic.

The concepts of *-autonomous category and autonomous category are directly related, specifically, every autonomous category is *-autonomous. A *-autonomous category may be described as a linearly distributive category with (left and right) negations; such categories have two monoidal products linked with a sort of distributive law. In the case where the two monoidal products coincide and the distributivities are taken from the associativity isomorphism of the single monoidal structure, one obtains autonomous categories.

Notes and references

Sources

Monoidal categories